Archie Smith may refer to:

Archie Smith (footballer, born 1995), Australian rules football player for Brisbane
Archie Smith (footballer, born 1872), former Australian rules football player for Collingwood
Archie Smith, Jr., American horse racing trainer
Archie Smith (racing driver), American racing driver
Archie Smith, Boy Wonder, an image in The Mysteries of Harris Burdick
Archie Smith Wholesale Fish Company, a historic site in Sebastian, Florida
Archie B. Smith (1896–1951), Canadian politician

See also
Archibald Smith (disambiguation)